The sitar ( or) is a plucked stringed instrument, originating from the Indian subcontinent, used in Hindustani classical music. The instrument was invented in medieval India, flourished in the 18th century, and arrived at its present form in 19th-century India. Khusrau Khan, an 18th-century figure of Mughal Empire has been identified by modern scholarship as the originator of Sitar. According to most historians, he developed the sitar from the setar, an Iranian instrument of Abbasid or Safavid origin. Another view supported by a minority of scholars is that Khusrau Khan developed it from Veena.

Used widely throughout the Indian subcontinent, the sitar became popularly known in the wider world through the works of Ravi Shankar, beginning in the late 1950s and early 1960s.  The advent of Psychedelic culture during the mid- to late 1960s created a trend for the use of the sitar in Western popular music, with the instrument appearing on tracks by bands such as the Beatles, the Doors, the Rolling Stones and others.

Etymology
The word Sitar is derived from the Hindi words sat tär, for seven strings.

History 

The book "The New Grove Dictionary of Music and Musicians" suggests possibility of the sitar's origin as that evolved from one or more instruments of the tanbūr family, long necked lutes which it argues were introduced and popularised during the period of Mughal rule. Allyn Miner, a concert performer and a Senior Lecturer in the Department of South Asia Studies at the University of Pennsylvania suggests that the evidence of indigenous long-necked lutes in India is particularly lacking. According to this view, when Muslim rule began in Northern India in 1192, the conquerors brought with them tanbur-family instruments, and other instruments in their "multi-national" army. In this early period, the Muslim instrument was linked to the tradition of Sufi ecstatic dance, "sufiānā rang".

It was also theorized in Muslim tradition, that the sitar was invented, or rather developed by Amir Khusrow ( 1253–1325), a famous Sufi inventor, poet and pioneer of Khyal, Tarana and Qawwali, during the 13th century. However, the tradition of Amir Khusrow is considered discredited by some scholars. Whatever instruments he might have played, no record exists from this period using the name "sitar".

Another, more minor hypothesis is that the sitar is derived from locally developed Indian instruments, such as the veena, prior to the arrival of Islam. Indian temple sculptures from the 9th and 10th centuries are known to feature sitar-like instruments. However, according to Allyn Miner, the evidence for this theory is too weak for any conclusion.

In the early Mughal Empire (1526–1707), tanbur-style instruments continued to be used in court. They were beginning to change; in images from the period, an instrument resembling an Uzbek dutar or a tambūrā is being played on the shoulder, with the "deep bridge of the modern sitar and the tambūrā". Looking at the musicians (the way they played their instruments in surviving images, their identities that were recorded) led historian Alastair Dick to conclude that the instrument was being adopted for Hindu music by Hindu musicians. The instrument was used for "Persian and Hindu melodies". According to Dick, the "modern view that ... invading Muslims simply changed into Persian the name of an existing Hindu instrument ... has no historical or musical foundation".

In the late Mughal Empire (1707–1858), the instrument began to take on its modern shape. The neck got wider. The bowl, which had been made of glued lathes of wood was now made of gourd, with metal frets and a bone nut on the neck.

By about 1725, the name sitar was used in the Hammir-raso by Jodhraj, a Rajasthan author. The instrument had 5 strings by this time. The beginnings of the modern 7-string tuning were present too.

Physical description

A sitar can have 18, 19, 20, or 21 strings; 6 or 7 of these run over curved, raised frets and are played strings; the remainder are sympathetic strings (tarb, also known as taarif or tarafdaar), running underneath the frets and resonating in sympathy with the played strings. These strings are generally used to set the mood of a raga at the very beginning of a presentation. The played strings run to tuning pegs on or near the head of the instrument, while the sympathetic strings, which have a variety of different lengths, pass through small holes in the fretboard to engage with the smaller tuning pegs that run down the instrument's neck.

The instrument has two bridges: the large bridge (badaa goraa) for the playing and drone strings and the small bridge (chota goraa) for the sympathetic strings. Its timbre results from the way the strings interact with the wide, rounded bridge. As a string vibrates, its length changes slightly as one edge moves along the rounded bridge, promoting the creation of overtones and giving the sound its distinctive tone. The maintenance of this specific tone by shaping the bridge is called jawari. Many musicians rely on instrument makers to adjust this.

Materials used in construction include teak wood or tun wood (Cedrela toona), which is a variation of mahogany, for the neck and faceplate (tabli), and calabash gourds for the resonating chambers. The instrument's bridges are made of deer horn, ebony, or very occasionally from camel bone. Synthetic material is now common as well.

Construction styles 

There are two popular modern styles of sitar: the fully decorated "instrumental style" (sometimes called the "Ravi Shankar style") and the "gayaki" style (sometimes called the "Vilayat Khan" style).

The instrumental style sitar is most often made of seasoned toon wood, but sometimes made of Burma teak. It is often fitted with a second resonator, a small tumba (pumpkin or pumpkin-like wood replica) on the neck. This style is usually fully decorated, with floral or grape carvings and celluloid inlays with colored (often brown or red) and black floral or arabesque patterns. It typically has 13 sympathetic strings. It is said that the best Burma teak sitars are made from teak that has been seasoned for generations. Therefore, instrument builders look for old Burma teak that was used in old colonial-style villas as whole trunk columns for their special sitar constructions. The sources of very old seasoned wood are a highly guarded trade secret and sometimes a mystery.

There are various additional sub-styles and cross mixes of styles in sitars, according to customer preferences. Most importantly, there are some differences in preferences for the positioning of sympathetic (taraf) string pegs (see photo).

Amongst all sitar styles, there are student styles, beginner models, semi-pro styles, pro-models, master models, and so on. Prices are often determined by the manufacturer's name and not by looks alone or materials used. Some sitars by certain manufacturers fetch very high collectible prices. Most notable are older Rikhi Ram (Delhi) and older Hiren Roy (Kolkata) sitars, depending upon which master built the instrument. Nikhil Banerjee had a small extra bridge fixed at the top of the Sitar fingerboard for sustenance of sound.

Tuning of sitar

Tuning depends on the sitarist's school or style, tradition and each artist's personal preference. The main playing string is almost invariably tuned a perfect fourth above the tonic, the second string being tuned to the tonic. The tonic in the Indian solfège system is referred to as ṣaḍja, ṣaḍaj, or the shortened form sa, or  khaṛaj, a dialectal variant of ṣaḍaj, not as vād, and the perfect fifth to which one or more of the drones strings are tuned is referred to as pañcam, not samvād.

 The player should re-tune for each raga. Strings are tuned by tuning pegs, and the main playing strings can be fine-tuned by sliding a bead threaded on each string just below the bridge.

In one or more of the more common tunings (used by Ravi Shankar, among others, called "Kharaj Pancham" sitar) the playable strings are strung in this fashion:
 Chikari strings: Sa (high), Sa (middle), and Pa.
 Kharaj (bass) strings: Sa (low) and Pa (low).
 Jod and baaj strings, Sa and Ma.

There is a lot of stylistic variance within these tunings, and like most Indian stringed instruments, there is no default tuning. Mostly, tunings vary by schools of teaching (gharana) and the piece that is meant to be played.

Playing
The instrument is balanced between the player's left foot and right knee. The hands move freely without having to carry any of the instrument's weight. The player plucks the string using a metallic pick or plectrum called a mizraab. The thumb stays anchored on the top of the fretboard just above the main gourd. Generally, only the index and middle fingers are used for fingering although a few players occasionally use the third. A specialized technique called "meend" involves pulling the main melody string down over the bottom portion of the sitar's curved frets, with which the sitarist can achieve a seven-semitone range of microtonal notes (however, because of the sitar's movable frets, sometimes a fret may be set to a microtone already, and no bending would be required). This was developed by Vilayat Khan into a technique that imitated the melisma of the vocal style, a technique known as gayaki ang.

Adept players bring in charisma through the use of special techniques like Kan, Krintan, Murki, Zamzama, etc. They also use special Mizrab Bol-s, as in Misrabani.

World music influence

In the late 1950s and early 1960s Ravi Shankar, along with his tabla player, Alla Rakha, began a further introduction of Indian classical music to Western culture.

The sitar saw use in Western popular music when, guided by David Crosby's championing of Shankar, George Harrison played it on the Beatles' songs "Norwegian Wood (This Bird Has Flown)", "Love You To" and "Within You Without You", recorded between 1965 and 1967. The Beatles' association with the instrument helped popularise Indian classical music among Western youth, particularly once Harrison began receiving tutelage from Shankar and the latter's protégé Shambhu Das in 1966. That same year, Brian Jones of the Rolling Stones used a sitar on "Paint It Black", while another English guitarist, Dave Mason, played it on Traffic's 1967 hits "Paper Sun" and "Hole in My Shoe". These and other examples marked a trend of featuring the instrument in pop songs, which Shankar later described as "the great sitar explosion". Speaking to KRLA Beat in July 1967, he said: "Many people, especially young people, have started listening to sitar since George Harrison, one of the Beatles, became my disciple ... It is now the 'in' thing."

Led Zeppelin's Jimmy Page talked about his love of Indian music, saying: "I went to India after I came back from a tour with the Yardbirds in the late sixties just so I could hear the music firsthand. Let's put it this way: I had a sitar before George Harrison got his. I wouldn't say I played it as well as he did, though..." Robbie Krieger's guitar part on the Doors' 1967 track "The End" was heavily influenced by Indian ragas and features melodic and rhythmic qualities that suggest a sitar or veena. Many pop performances actually involve the electric sitar, which is a solid-body, guitar-like instrument and quite different from the traditional acoustic Indian instrument.

The Kinks' 1965 single "See My Friends" featured a "low-tuned drone guitar" that was widely mistaken to be a sitar. Crosby's band, the Byrds, had similarly incorporated elements of Indian music, using "only Western instrumentation", on their songs "Eight Miles High" and "Why" in 1965. Psychedelic music bands often used new recording techniques and effects and drew on non-Western sources such as the ragas and drones of Indian music. The Electric Prunes appeared in early ads for the Vox Wah wah pedal, which touted the effect's ability to make an electric guitar sound like a sitar 

Donovan's personnel on his 1966 album Sunshine Superman included  Shawn Phillips on sitar.  Phillips also played sitar on one song on Donovan's next album Mellow Yellow, produced in 1967.

Steve Howe of the British progressive rock band Yes played a Danelectro sitar guitar on their album Close to the Edge. Deepak Khazanchi played sitar and tanpura on one song on Yes's 1983 album 90125.

Sitar gharanas 

 Imdadkhani gharana
 Senia Gharana
 Indore Gharana (Beenkar Gharana)
 Maihar gharana
 Jaipur Gharana
 Bishnupur gharana
 Lucknow-Shahjahaanpur Gharana
 Dharwad Gharana
 Senia Rampur Gharana

See also 
 :Category:Sitar players
 :Sitar in popular music

References

External links

Indian musical instruments
Indian inventions